Batek Island or Fatu Sinai is a small uninhabited island located in the Savu Sea, northwest of the island of Timor,  off the East Timorese municipality of Oecusse. The sovereignty of the island is disputed between Indonesia and East Timor.

It is 530 meters long and 420 meters wide, for an area of 13.5 hectares. Its highest point is fifty meters above sea level.

East Timor is claiming the island, using a map of 1914 as reference. In 2004, Indonesian Colonel Moesanip said that this claim was abandoned when the East Timorese Minister of Foreign Affairs, José Ramos-Horta, recognized Indonesian sovereignty over the island. However, East Timorese chief negotiator Xanana Gusmão indicated in 2022 that negotiations were continuing.

References

Islands of Indonesia
Islands of East Timor
Landforms of East Nusa Tenggara
Disputed islands